The 2012 WAFF Futsal Championship was the 3rd WAFF Futsal Championship. It was held in Ghadir Arena, Urmia, Iran between 27 April and 2 May 2012.

Teams 
 (6)
 (55)
 (Inactive for more than 24 months)
 (70)
 (90)

Group stage 
The draw was held on 26 April 2012.

Awards 

 Most Valuable Player
  Samer Naser Aldeen
 Top Scorer
  Javad Asghari Moghaddam   Vahid Shamsaei (8 goals each)
 Best Goalkeeper
  Mostafa Nazari
 Fair-Play Award

See also
 West Asian Futsal Championship

References

External links
2012 WAFF Futsal Championship results

2012
2012
WAFF
2011–12 in Iranian futsal
2011–12 in Jordanian football
2011–12 in Iraqi football
2011–12 in Kuwaiti football
2011–12 in Palestinian football